Shlomo Molla (born 21 November 1965) is an Israeli politician who served as a member of the Knesset for Kadima and Hatnuah between 2008 and 2013. He became Israel's second MK of Ethiopian origin.

Biography
Molla was born in a small Jewish village of 40 families in Gondar Province in Ethiopia in 1965 into a family of 9 brothers and 2 sisters. Molla attempted to immigrate to Israel in 1984 on foot, after being overlooked by Operation Moses and Operation Joshua. He was rescued by Israeli forces in Sudan; during his journey in Sudan, one of the Ethiopian Jews traveling with him was shot and killed by Sudanese forces. Upon reaching Israel, he was sent to an immigrant absorption center in Tzfat. Ill with malaria upon arrival to Israel, he learned Hebrew in the hospital. After his national service in the Israel Defense Forces, he studied for a BA in social work at Bar-Ilan University. During his studies he served as co-chairman of the Organization of Ethiopian Students. He later also gained an LLB from Ono Academic College.

In 1991, he became head of a Jewish Agency immigrant absorption center in Tiberias, and in 1995 was appointed supervisor of the absorption centers and ulpans in northern kibbutzim.  In 1996 he became a member of the Ministry of Health's committee to advise on war conditions, and in 1999 he became head of the Jewish Agency's Ethiopian Division.  In the same year Molla won eighth place on Yisrael BaAliyah's list for the Knesset elections, but the party won only six seats.

In 2006, he was a member of the Zionist Executive and head of department at the World Zionist Organization. Prior to the 2006 elections he was placed thirty-third on Kadima's list. However, following the resignation of Avigdor Yitzhaki in February 2008, Molla became the second MK of Ethiopian origin. He was placed nineteenth on the Kadima list for the 2009 elections, and retained his seat as the party won 28 mandates.

In 2012 he left Kadima to join the new Hatnuah party. Placed eighth on its list for the 2013 elections, he lost his seat when the party won only six seats.

In 2015, he encouraged Ethiopian-Israelis to refuse to pay taxes or to serve in the Israeli armed forces to protest racist acts against Ethiopian-Israelis such as the police assault on Demas Fikadey.

Molla is married with three children, and lives in Rishon LeZion.

References

External links

1965 births
Living people
Bar-Ilan University alumni
Beta Israel
Black Jewish members of the Knesset
Deputy Speakers of the Knesset
Ethiopian emigrants to Israel
Ethiopian Jews
Ethiopian Zionists
Hatnua politicians
Israeli Jews
Israeli people of Ethiopian-Jewish descent
Jewish Israeli politicians
Kadima politicians
Members of the 17th Knesset (2006–2009)
Members of the 18th Knesset (2009–2013)
Ono Academic College alumni
People from Amhara Region
Yisrael BaAliyah politicians